Lucinda Davis (born July 14, 1981) is a Canadian actress. She starred in the role of Tanya Panda on the Canadian youth television series Radio Active. 

Davis voiced Layla and Digit in the English version of Winx Club made by Cinélume, the Concubine in the 2008 video game Prince of Persia and Sophie in the English version of Snowtime!. She also played the character 'Major Jones' in the miniseries XIII: The Conspiracy which was released in France in 2008 and in the United States in 2009. Davis is also a theater actress and in 2015 was nominated for a Montreal English Theatre Award for her performance in Random.

Selected filmography

Film

Television

Video games

Theatre

 The Night a Tiger was Captured (Dusk 'till Dawn) - Liangu
 Mad Boy Chronicle (McGill) - Skalde/Chorus
 Nervous Breakdown (Tuesday Night Café) - Sonya
 The Art of Dining (McGill Players Theatre) - Hannah Galt
 Tooth and Nail (McGill) - Thandi
 Deven Deadly Sins (McGill Players Theatre) - Chorus
 Yeoman of the Guard (Savoy Society) - Chorus
 Cracked (Black Rabbit) - Chelsea
 The Weir (Whip) - Valerie
 Rocky Horror Live (Rainbow Collective) - Colombia
 The Lady Smith (Black Theatre Workshop) - Cynthia
 Gas (Infinitheatre) - Cole
 Doubt (Centaur) - Mrs. Muller
 The Madona Painter (Centaur) - Mary Louise
 Intimate Apparel (Centaur) - Esther
 Richard III (Metachroma) - Lady Anne
 Duet (Black Theatre Workshop) - Billie (Winner Best Actress - Professional Category 2013 META Awards)
 The Gravitational Pull of Bernice Trimble (Obsidien/Factory) - Sara
 The Book of Bob (Centaur) - God
 Top Girls (Segal Centre) - Patient Griselda / Nell
 Adventures of a Black Girl in Search of God (Centaur/National Arts Centre) - Rainey
 I AM For You (National Arts Centre) - Mariam
 Twelfth Night (National Arts Centre) - Viola
 Halloween Tree (D.B. Clarke) - Sally
 39 Steps (Centaur) - Clown

References

External links

1981 births
Living people
Actresses from Montreal
Canadian television actresses
Canadian voice actresses
Black Canadian actresses
Anglophone Quebec people
Canadian people of Jamaican descent